Kellaways - West Tytherton, River Avon SSSI is a 4.1 hectare geological Site of Special Scientific Interest in Wiltshire, notified in 1998.

References

External links
 Natural England website (SSSI information)

Sites of Special Scientific Interest in Wiltshire
Sites of Special Scientific Interest notified in 1998